James P. Lordi (December 1, 1910 – June 1985) was an American Democratic Party politician who served in the New Jersey General Assembly.

A lawyer and former executive secretary to Newark Mayor Ralph A. Villani, Lordi was elected to the Assembly in 1969 to represent Essex County District 11A.  Running with incumbent Paul Policastro, they easily defeated the Republican candidates, Raymond Bossert and Charles J. Chirichiello.  Lordi did not seek re-election to a second term in 1971 and was replaced on the ticket by Democrat Frank Megaro.

Family
Lordi's brother, Joseph P. Lordi, was an Essex County Prosecutor and the first chairman of the New Jersey Casino Control Commission.

References

1910 births
1985 deaths
New Jersey lawyers
Politicians from Essex County, New Jersey
Democratic Party members of the New Jersey General Assembly
20th-century American lawyers
20th-century American politicians